Roba Helane (born 13 January 1990) is a Syrian road cyclist, who represented her nation at the 2011 UCI Road World Championships.

Major results

2011
 6th Golan I
 7th Golan II
2014
 1st Road race, National Road Championships
2015
 National Road Championships
1st Road race
1st Time trial

References

External links
 

1990 births
Syrian female cyclists
Living people
Place of birth missing (living people)
Cyclists at the 2010 Asian Games
Cyclists at the 2014 Asian Games
Cyclists at the 2018 Asian Games
Asian Games competitors for Syria
21st-century Syrian women